Platyscia is a monotypic moth genus of the family Erebidae. Its only species, Platyscia mesoscia, is found in Ghana. Both the genus and species were first described by George Hampson in 1926.

References

Endemic fauna of Ghana
Calpinae
Monotypic moth genera